Jorge Hernández Jiménez (born 6 September 1948) is a Colombian former cyclist. He competed in the 1000m time trial events at the 1968 Summer Olympics and the team pursuit event at the 1976 Summer Olympics.

References

1948 births
Living people
Colombian male cyclists
Olympic cyclists of Colombia
Cyclists at the 1968 Summer Olympics
Cyclists at the 1976 Summer Olympics
20th-century Colombian people